Insomnia is a 1997 Norwegian thriller film about a police detective investigating a murder in a town located above the Arctic Circle. The investigation goes horribly wrong when he mistakenly shoots his partner and subsequently attempts to cover up his bungle. The title of the film refers to his inability to sleep, the result of his guilt (represented by the relentless glare of the midnight sun). Insomnia was the film debut of director Erik Skjoldbjærg. The screenplay was written by Nikolaj Frobenius and Skjoldbjærg, and the soundtrack by Geir Jenssen.

The film inspired the 2002 American remake Insomnia.

Plot

When 17-year-old Tanja is found murdered in the city of Tromsø, far up in the Norwegian Arctic, Kripos police officers Jonas Engström (Stellan Skarsgård) and Erik Vik (Sverre Anker Ousdal) are called in to investigate. Engström is a police inspector formerly with the Swedish police who moved to Norway after being caught having sex with the main witness in one of his cases. Vik is nearing retirement age, and his memory is failing.

Engström devises a plan to lure the murderer back to the scene of the crime, but the stakeout is blown and the murder suspect flees into the fog. Events take a turn for the worse when the fugitive shoots one of the pursuing unarmed Norwegian police officers. Without telling his colleagues, however, Engström carries a gun from his days in the Swedish police, who routinely carry firearms. While shooting at what he believes to be the suspect, Engstrom accidentally kills Vik, who had mistakenly run right instead of left as ordered.

Engström initially tells the truth about the shooting, but realises that everyone assumes that the fugitive shot Vik. He decides to conceal his culpability. When one of his colleagues, Hilde Hagen (Gisken Armand), is assigned to investigate Vik's death, Engström becomes worried about ballistic fingerprinting and tampers with evidence to support his story. Haunted by guilt and unable to sleep with the midnight sun of the Arctic, Engström becomes increasingly unhinged and starts hallucinating about Vik. Things become even worse when he learns that Tanja's murderer saw him shoot Vik.

Engström learns from one of Tanja's friends that she had been seeing Jon Holt (Bjørn Floberg), a crime novelist. He correctly deduces that Holt killed Tanja, but Holt blackmails Engström with his knowledge of the Vik shooting. The two meet and decide to frame Tanja's boyfriend Eilert for her murder, with Engström later planting Holt's gun under Eilert's bed. However, Hagen is not convinced of Eilert's involvement, and when new evidence emerges, Engström knows that it's only a matter of time until Holt is arrested.

Engström tracks down Holt in some rotting wooden buildings at the waterfront and tries to talk with him. Holt suspects that Engström has come to kill him and holds him at gunpoint. He explains how he killed Tanja in a fit of rage when she rejected his advances. Holt tries to flee across a pier, but the rotten floorboards give way and he falls into the water below, striking his head on the way. He drowns as Engström watches. When he rummages through Holt's nearby house, Engström finds Tanja's dress, which Holt had removed before dumping the body. With Holt dead, and this definitive proof that he was the murderer, the case is closed.

Just before he leaves town, Engström is visited by Hagen, who shows him a cartridge case found at the site where Vik was shot. She notes that it is a Norma case, which Engström confirms is a brand used by the Swedish police. Engström expects Hagen to arrest him, but instead she simply places the cartridge case on a table and leaves. Engström drives out of town, his face and eyes showing great weariness; he seems not to have recovered from his insomnia.

Cast
Stellan Skarsgård as Jonas Engström
Sverre Anker Ousdal as Erik Vik
Bjørn Floberg as Jon Holt
Gisken Armand as Hilde Hagen
Maria Bonnevie as Ane
Bjørn Moan as Eilert
Maria Mathiesen as Tanja Lorentzen
Marianne O. Ulrichsen as Frøya
Kristian Figenschow as Arne Zakariassen
Thor Michael Aamodt as Tom Engen
Frode Rasmussen as Chief of Police

Critical reception
The film has been widely praised as a psychological study and "semi-noir". Roger Ebert of the Chicago Sun-Times compared it to the Fyodor Dostoyevsky novel Crime and Punishment. For the New York Times, Janet Maslin praised the principal performance by Skarsgård and added that "Mr. Skjoldbjærg's understated, elliptical direction keeps the material dangerous and volatile, with frequent small touches of the unexpected as Engstrom shows increasing signs of strain."

Remake

A remake of the film was directed by Christopher Nolan. The film, featuring Al Pacino, Robin Williams, and Hilary Swank, was released in 2002.

References

External links
 
 
 
Insomnia an essay by Peter Cowie at the Criterion Collection
Insomnia: Unbearable Lightness an essay by Jonathan Romney at the Criterion Collection

1990s psychological thriller films
1997 films
Films directed by Erik Skjoldbjærg
Films set in Norway
Films set in the Arctic
Neo-noir
Norwegian thriller films
1990s Norwegian-language films
Police detective films
1990s Swedish-language films
Insomnia in film
1997 multilingual films
Norwegian multilingual films